Peter Ehle House is a historic home located at Nelliston in Montgomery County, New York.  It was built about 1826 and is a rectangular, two story stone building with a gable roof and inside end chimneys in the Late Federal style.  Also on the property is a large barn complex including a large frame barn, two carriage houses, and a small stone outbuilding.  Remains of a large part stone barn are also present.

It was added to the National Register of Historic Places in 1980.

References

Houses on the National Register of Historic Places in New York (state)
Federal architecture in New York (state)
Houses in Montgomery County, New York
National Register of Historic Places in Montgomery County, New York